Bovesia, otherwise known as Grecìa Calabra (Calabrian Greece), is one of the two remaining Griko-speaking areas in southern Italy, the other being Grecìa Salentina. It is located at the tip of Calabria, near Reggio, and consists of nine villages. Its population is significantly smaller than the one of Grecìa Salentina.

It consists of the villages:
Bova (Calabrian Greek Chòra tu Vùa, Βοῦα, or i Chora) and Bova Marina (Greek Jalo tu Vùa) (3870 inhabitants)
Palizzi (Spiròpoli) and Palizzi Marina,
Condofuri (Kontofyria, or Kontochòri, meaning «near the village»)
Gallicianò and Amendolea,
Roccaforte del Greco (Greek Vuni)
Roghudi (Greek: Roghudion, or Choriò)

External links
 Grecìa Calabra

Geographical, historical and cultural regions of Italy
Geography of Calabria
Greek-speaking countries and territories